Theodor Lipps (28 July 1851 – 17 October 1914) was a German philosopher, famed for his theory regarding aesthetics, creating the framework for the concept of Einfühlung (empathy),  defined as, "projecting oneself onto the object of perception." This has then led onto opening up a new branch of interdisciplinary research in the overlap between psychology and philosophy.

Biography
Lipps was one of the most influential German university professors of his time, attracting many students from other countries. Lipps was very concerned with conceptions of art and the aesthetic, focusing much of his philosophy around such issues. Among his fervent admirers was Sigmund Freud. There were at least two theories that made an impact on Freud's works. The first was Lipps' theory of the unconscious mental events. Lipps was then a main supporter of the idea of the Unconscious.  The second was Lipps' works on humor.

Einfühlung 
He adopted Robert Vischer's notions of empathy or esthetic sympathy (Einfühlung, literally translated to "feeling-into"). He was responsible for popularizing the term by modifying Vischer's conceptualization. Particularly, Lipps concealed some of the thinker's mysticism, hiding it within the sphere of scientific psychology in his work, Aesthetics of Space and Geometrical Illusions. The term was used to describe the process of contemplating art objects as representation of our feelings. Lipps developed it into an aesthetic theory, which was refined further by other thinkers such as Roger Fry and Vernon Lee. This concept of aesthetic resonance finds parallels throughout aesthetic philosophy. In this concept, empathy is said to begin with both the object and the pleasure drawn together in a single act instead of a separate object with which we have aesthetic enjoyment or with pleasure taken in an object. According to Lipps, empathy incorporates movement or activity, which is bound up with observed object by: 1) being derived from it; and, 2) by being inseparable from it. For his works, he is considered one of the most important representatives of the psychology of aesthetics alongside Stephan Witasek and Johannes Volkelt.

Psychologism 
Lipps was an important adherent of psychologism early in his career. This philosophy was based on the Neo-Kantianism that became influential in German philosophy during the second half of the nineteenth century. He became a spokesman of this school as evidenced in his early publications. In his work, Logik (1893), he declared his "unlimited foundational logical psychologism", which is based on a partial identity of psychology of thinking and the logic of thinking. Here, logic is considered the "physics of thinking" rather than an "ethics of thinking". According to Lipps, "logic is a psychological discipline, as certain as the cognition occurs only in the psyche, and the thinking, which completes itself in the cognition, is a psychical event."

Late in life, Lipps adopted some ideas from Edmund Husserl as he developed in another direction. Disliking his psychologism, some of his students joined with some of Husserl's to form a new branch of philosophy called phenomenology of essences. Among them there was Moritz Geiger who wrote one of the first phenomenological essays on the essence and meaning of empathy in which the influence of Lipps is relevant. There was also Paul Ferdinand Linke who studied under Lipps at the Ludwig-Maximilians-Universitat and dealt with Husserlian phenomenology in his first publication, Die phaenomenale Sphaere.

In the so-called aesthetics of "oughtness", Lipps attempted to reconcile "ought" with "is".

See also 
 Otto Selz

References

Sources 

 Hatfield, G. Psychology Old and New, Institute for Research in Cognitive Science Technical Report No.IRCS-01-07 (University of Pennsylvania, 2001)
 Lyubimova, T. "On the Comic", in: Aesthetics, Art, Life: A Collection of Articles, compiled by T. Lyubimova, M. Ovsyannikov; general editorship by A. Zis; translated from the Russian by Sergei Syrovatkin (Moscow: Raduga Publishers, 1988), pp. 200–211.

External links 

 
 
 Some digitized texts by Lipps in the Virtual Laboratory of the Max Planck Institute for the History of Science

1851 births
1914 deaths
19th-century essayists
19th-century German non-fiction writers
19th-century German male writers
19th-century German writers
19th-century German philosophers
20th-century essayists
20th-century German non-fiction writers
20th-century German philosophers
Continental philosophers
German male essayists
German male non-fiction writers
Phenomenologists
Philosophers of art
Philosophers of culture
Philosophers of mind
Philosophy academics
Philosophy writers